The Bismarck Bobcats are a Tier II junior ice hockey team in the North American Hockey League's (NAHL) Central Division, and play out of Bismarck, North Dakota, in the V.F.W. Sports Center. Originally a part of the American Frontier Hockey League (and later called the America West Hockey League), the Bobcats joined the NAHL in a merger of the two leagues in 2003. In 2005, the Bobcats hosted the Robertson Cup tournament.

The Bobcats won the 2010 Robertson Cup, winning the national championship with a 3–0 victory over the Fairbanks Ice Dogs.

History
The Bismarck Bobcats came to Bismarck in 1997 as a member of the American Frontier Hockey League (AFWHL) and played their first season at the Bismarck Civic Center, but moved to the V.F.W. Sports Center the following year. The AFHL rebranded to the America West Hockey League (AWHL) in 1998. The Bobcats won back-to-back Borne Cup titles as champions of the AWHL in 2003 and 2004. Their 2004 title was the last Borne Cup to be awarded prior to the merger between the North American Hockey League (NAHL) and AWHL for the 2004–05 season.

Byron Pool served as head coach from 2008 to 2010 and was named the NAHL "Coach of the Year" in 2009. In addition to leading the team to its first Robertson Cup title in 2010, he led the Bobcats to the most successful regular season in history in the 2008–09 season. The Bobcats won 43 games and earned 88 points in the standings, which both set franchise records. The Bobcats won consecutive Central Division playoff titles under Pool in 2009 and 2010.

Layne Sedevie became head coach in 2010, promoted from assistant coach, following Byron Pool's decision to accept an associate head coach position with the Fargo Force of the United States Hockey League. Sedevie, a Bismarck native, was a goaltender at Bemidji State University and played professionally in the Central Hockey League before serving as assistant coach under Pool for the 2009–10 season. In his first season behind the bench, he led the Bobcats to their third straight Central Division playoff championship.

The Bobcats have had five head coaches in their tenure in Bismarck including: John Becanic; Chad Johnson, Dane Litke, Pool, and Sedevie.

Currently, they are the second-oldest franchise in the NAHL behind the Springfield Jr. Blues.

Rivalries
The Bobcats have two primary rivals: the Aberdeen Wings and the Minot Minotauros.

The Bobcats-Wings rivalry is centered on the Titan Machinery Dakota Cup. The Bobcats, despite being the defending national champions in 2010–11, suffered multiple setbacks against the expansion Wings in front of capacity crowds at both teams' rinks before winning the trophy by a point total of 15–11. The 2011–12 Dakota Cup was much more lopsided, as the Bobcats won the Cup 21–7, posting a 10–1–1 regular season record against the Wings. In the 2012 playoffs, the Bobcats defeated the Wings in four games in the Central Division semifinals.

The Bobcats and Tauros is a newer intrastate rivalry, and the proximity (roughly 100 miles along US-83) of the two teams that share North Dakota has already produced multiple fights.

Former Bobcats rivals include the Alexandria Blizzard, North Iowa Outlaws, and Owatonna Express.

Season-by-season records

Playoffs
2006
First Round, Fargo-Moorhead Jets defeated Bismarck Bobcats 3-games-to-1
2009
First Round, Bismarck Bobcats defeated Alexandria Blizzard 3-games-to-1
Second Round, Bismarck Bobcats defeated Owatonna Express 3-games-to-2
Robertson Cup Round-robin, Bismarck Bobcats (1–3) – Eliminated (L, 2–4 vs. Phantoms; L, 2–5 vs. Bandits; W, 3–2 vs. Outlaws; L, 2–3 vs. Wild)
2010
First Round, Bismarck Bobcats defeated Albert Lea Thunder 3-games-to-0
Second Round, Bismarck Bobcats defeated Alexandria Blizzard 3-games-to-0
Robertson Cup Round-robin,  Bismarck Bobcats (2–2) – Qualified for Finals (W, 5–2 vs. Bandits; W, 6–1 vs. North Stars; L, 1–2 vs.  Wild; L, 3–4 vs. Ice Dogs)
Robertson Cup Championship game, Bismarck Bobcats defeated Fairbanks Ice Dogs 3–0 
Robertson Cup Champions
2011
Divisional Semifinals, Bismarck Bobcats defeated Alexandria Blizzard 3-games-to-2
Divisional Finals, Bismarck Bobcats defeated Coulee Region Chill 3-games-to-2
Playoff Qualifier, Michigan Warriors defeated Bismarck Bobcats 2-games-to-0 
2012
Divisional Semifinals, Bismarck Bobcats defeated Aberdeen Wings 3-games-to-1
Divisional Finals, Bismarck Bobcats defeated Austin Bruins 3-games-to-1
Robertson Cup Round-robin, Bismarck Bobcats (1–2) – Eliminated (L, 1–5 vs. Fighting Falcons; W, 3–2 vs. Bandits; L, 2–6 vs. Bulls)
2013
Divisional Semifinals, Bismarck Bobcats defeated Brookings Blizzard 3-games-to-0
Divisional Finals, Bismarck Bobcats defeated Austin Bruins 3-games-to-1
Robertson Cup Round-robin, Bismarck Bobcats (2–1) – Eliminated (W, 3–2 vs. Wild; L, 1–2 vs. Bulls; W, 4–3 vs. Ironmen)
2014
Divisional Semifinals, Bismarck Bobcats defeated Aberdeen Wings 3-games-to-0
Divisional Finals, Austin Bruins  defeated Bismarck Bobcats 3-games-to-2
2015
Divisional Semifinals, Minot Minotauros  defeated Bismarck Bobcats 3-games-to-0
2016
Divisional Semifinals, Bismarck Bobcats defeated Brookings Blizzard 3-games-to-1
Division Finals, Bismarck Bobcats defeated Austin Bruins 3-games-to-2
Robertson Cup Semifinals, Wichita Falls Wildcats defeated Bismarck Bobcats 2-games-to-0
2019
Divisional Semifinals, Minot Minotauros defeated Bismarck Bobcats 3-games-to-0
2021
Division Semifinals, Bismarck Bobcats defeated Minnesota Wilderness 3-games-to-0
Division Finals, Aberdeen Wings defeated Bismarck Bobcats 3-games-to-0
2022
Divisional Semifinals, St. Cloud Norsemen defeated Bismarck Bobcats 3-games-to-2

References

External links
Bismarck Bobcats website

North American Hockey League teams
Sports in Bismarck, North Dakota
Ice hockey teams in North Dakota
1997 establishments in North Dakota
Ice hockey clubs established in 1997